"Baby" is the second single from rapper LL Cool J's 13th album Exit 13. It features The-Dream, who co-wrote and produced the song alongside Tricky Stewart.

Music video
The music video, directed by Benny Boom, premiered on FNMTV on July 11, 2008. In the video, they are at a party. LL spots a girl, and throughout the video, it shows him and the girl in a car and a store. They stand back to back during The-Dream's verse.

Responses and samples
Rapper Chamillionaire released a skit entitled "Not Your Baby". His song "Answer Machine 3", on his Mixtape Messiah 4 album, sampled "Baby"'s instrumental.

Charts

Weekly charts

Year-end charts

Release
iTunes started a type of Countdown to Exit 13. The first release was Baby featuring The-Dream and the second release was the rock remix of "Baby" featuring Richie Sambora.

Rock Remix
The rock remix of "Baby" featuring Richie Sambora is the official remix of the song, and the remix is in the album as the 8th track.

The song was released on August 19, 2008 as an 'exclusive single' on iTunes. The cover is slightly different from the Baby single, because it was a darker look.

References

External links
 LL Cool J - "Baby" music video

2008 singles
2008 songs
LL Cool J songs
The-Dream songs
Def Jam Recordings singles
Music videos directed by Benny Boom
Song recordings produced by Tricky Stewart
Songs written by LL Cool J
Songs written by The-Dream
Songs written by 50 Cent
Songs written by Tricky Stewart
Song recordings produced by The-Dream